Live at the Olympic Auditorium is a concert film by American rock band Suicidal Tendencies, recorded live at the Grand Olympic Auditorium in Los Angeles on 2005. The video was released through the band's own Suicidal Records on January 26, 2010.

Track listing
 "Intro" – 1:38
 "I Shot Reagan" – 2:47
 "War Inside My Head" – 3:52
 "Subliminal" – 5:37
 "Ain't Gonna Take It" – 3:41
 "Suicidal Failure" – 3:38
 "Send Me Your Money" – 3:55
 "We Are Family" – 4:38
 "Possessed to Skate" – 3:28
 "I Saw Your Mommy" – 6:00
 "Waking the Dead" – 3:19
 "Show Some Love...Tear It Down!" – 4:47
 "Cyco Vision" – 2:17
 "Two-Sided Politics" – 1:46
 "Won't Fall in Love Today" – 3:58
 "Institutionalized" – 6:25
 "Pledge Your Allegiance" – 5:49

Personnel 
Mike Muir - Lead Vocals
Mike Clark - Guitar
Dean Pleasants - Lead Guitar
Thundercat - Bass
Dave Hidalgo - Drums

Recorded and mixed by Paul Northfield
Directed by Glen Bennett

References 

2010 video albums
Suicidal Tendencies albums
2010 live albums
Live video albums